The 11th Islamic Consultative Assembly is the 35th and current Parliament of Iran that commenced on 27 May 2020 following the legislative elections on 21 February and 11 September 2020.

Composition 
279 representatives have been elected in the first round of the legislative elections held on 21 February 2020. The second round to elect the 11 remaining seats was postponed due to COVID-19 pandemic in Iran and held on 11 September 2020.

References 

parliran.ir – List of 11th term parliament representatives 

11th legislature of the Islamic Republic of Iran